Michael W. Graham (born 11 January 1952) is a former Australian rules footballer who played with  in the South Australian National Football League (SANFL) and St Mary's in the Northern Territory Football League (NTFL) during the 1970s and 1980s.

A half forward flanker nicknamed "The Flash" for his great speed, Graham made his SANFL debut for Sturt in 1971 and went on to play 282 games over fifteen seasons. He was a premiership player in 1974 and 1976, and represented South Australia in Interstate Football on eleven occasions. He is cap number 757 for the Sturt Football Club.

Graham played with St Marys in the NTFL during the summers, winning the Nichols Medal in 1973-74 for the league's best and fairest player.

In 2005 he was named on the interchange bench in the official Indigenous Team of the Century. He is also a member of Sturt's 'Team of the Twentieth Century'; and the Inaugural '2016 NT Indigenous Team of the Century'.

Notes

References

1952 births
Living people
Indigenous Australian players of Australian rules football
Australian rules footballers from South Australia
Sturt Football Club players
St Mary's Football Club (NTFL) players
South Australian State of Origin players
South Australian Football Hall of Fame inductees